In geometry, a Schwarz triangle, named after Hermann Schwarz, is a spherical triangle that can be used to tile a sphere (spherical tiling), possibly overlapping, through reflections in its edges.

These can be defined more generally as tessellations of the sphere, the Euclidean plane, or the hyperbolic plane. Each Schwarz triangle on a sphere defines a finite group, while on the Euclidean or hyperbolic plane they define an infinite group.

A Schwarz triangle is represented by three rational numbers  each representing the angle at a vertex. "2" means a right triangle. When these are whole numbers, the triangle is called a Möbius triangle, and corresponds to a non-overlapping tiling, and the symmetry group is called a triangle group. In the sphere there are three Möbius triangles plus one one-parameter family; in the plane there are three Möbius triangles, while in hyperbolic space there is a three-parameter family of Möbius triangles, and no exceptional objects.

Solution space 

 

Graphical representation 
A Schwarz triangle is represented graphically by a triangular graph. Each node represents an edge (mirror) of the Schwarz triangle. Each edge is labeled by a rational value corresponding to the reflection order, being π/vertex angle.

Order-2 edges represent perpendicular mirrors that can be ignored in this diagram. The Coxeter-Dynkin diagram represents this triangular graph with order-2 edges hidden.

A Coxeter group can be used for a simpler notation, as (p q r) for cyclic graphs, and (p q 2) = [p,q] for (right triangles), and (p 2 2) = [p]×[].

A list of Schwarz triangles

Möbius triangles for the sphere 

Schwarz triangles with whole numbers, also called Möbius triangles, include one 1-parameter family and three exceptional cases:

 [p,2] or (p 2 2) – Dihedral symmetry, 
 [3,3] or (3 3 2) – Tetrahedral symmetry, 
 [4,3] or (4 3 2) – Octahedral symmetry, 
 [5,3] or (5 3 2) – Icosahedral symmetry,

Schwarz triangles for the sphere by density 
The Schwarz triangles (p q r), grouped by density:

Triangles for the Euclidean plane 

Density 1:

 (3 3 3) – 60-60-60 (equilateral), 
 (4 4 2) – 45-45-90 (isosceles right), 
 (6 3 2) – 30-60-90, 

Density 2:

 (6 6 3/2) - 120-30-30 triangle

Density ∞:

 (4 4/3 ∞)
 (3 3/2 ∞)
 (6 6/5 ∞)

Triangles for the hyperbolic plane 

Density 1:

 (2 3 7), (2 3 8), (2 3 9) ... (2 3 ∞)
 (2 4 5), (2 4 6), (2 4 7) ... (2 4 ∞)
 (2 5 5), (2 5 6), (2 5 7) ... (2 5 ∞)
 (2 6 6), (2 6 7), (2 6 8) ... (2 6 ∞)
 (3 3 4), (3 3 5), (3 3 6) ... (3 3 ∞)
 (3 4 4), (3 4 5), (3 4 6) ... (3 4 ∞)
 (3 5 5), (3 5 6), (3 5 7) ... (3 5 ∞)
 (3 6 6), (3 6 7), (3 6 8) ... (3 6 ∞)
 ...
 (∞ ∞ ∞)

Density 2:

 (3/2 7 7), (3/2 8 8), (3/2 9 9) ... (3/2 ∞ ∞)
 (5/2 4 4), (5/2 5 5), (5/2 6 6) ... (5/2 ∞ ∞)
 (7/2 3 3), (7/2 4 4), (7/2 5 5) ... (7/2 ∞ ∞)
 (9/2 3 3), (9/2 4 4), (9/2 5 5) ... (9/2 ∞ ∞)
 ...

Density 3:

 (2 7/2 7), (2 9/2 9), (2 11/2 11) ...

Density 4:

 (7/3 3 7), (8/3 3 8), (3 10/3 10), (3 11/3 11) ...

Density 6:

 (7/4 7 7), (9/4 9 9), (11/4 11 11) ...
 (7/2 7/2 7/2), (9/2 9/2 9/2), ...

Density 10:

 (3 7/2 7)

The (2 3 7) Schwarz triangle is the smallest hyperbolic Schwarz triangle, and as such is of particular interest. Its triangle group (or more precisely the index 2 von Dyck group of orientation-preserving isometries) is the (2,3,7) triangle group, which is the universal group for all Hurwitz groups – maximal groups of isometries of Riemann surfaces. All Hurwitz groups are quotients of the (2,3,7) triangle group, and all Hurwitz surfaces are tiled by the (2,3,7) Schwarz triangle. The smallest Hurwitz group is the simple group of order 168, the second smallest non-abelian simple group, which is isomorphic to PSL(2,7), and the associated Hurwitz surface (of genus 3) is the Klein quartic.

The (2 3 8) triangle tiles the Bolza surface, a highly symmetric (but not Hurwitz) surface of genus 2.

The triangles with one noninteger angle, listed above, were first classified by Anthony W. Knapp in.  A list of triangles with multiple noninteger angles is given in.

Tessellation by Schwarz triangles

In this section tessellations of the hyperbolic upper half plane by Schwarz triangles will be discussed using elementary methods. For triangles without "cusps"—angles equal to zero or equivalently vertices on the real axis—the elementary approach of  will be followed. Alternatively—by dividing the ideal triangle into six triangles with angles 0, /2 and /3—the tessellation by ideal triangles can be understood in terms of tessellations by triangles with one or two cusps.

Triangles without cusps

Suppose that the hyperbolic triangle Δ has angles /a, /b and /c with a, b, c integers greater than 1. The hyperbolic area of Δ equals  – /a – /b – /c, so that

The construction of a tessellation will first be carried out for the case when a, b and c are greater than 2.

The original triangle Δ gives a convex polygon P1 with 3 vertices. At each of the three vertices the triangle can be successively reflected through edges emanating from the vertices to produce 2m copies of the triangle where the angle at the vertex is /m. The triangles do not overlap except at the edges, half of them have their orientation reversed and they fit together to tile a neighborhood of the point. The union of these new triangles together with the original triangle form a connected shape P2. Even in this degenerate case when an angle of  arises, the two collinear edge are still considered as distinct for the purposes of the construction.

The construction of P2 can be understood more clearly by noting that some triangles or tiles are added twice, the three which have a side in common with the original triangle. The rest have only a vertex in common. A more systematic way of performing the tiling is first to add a tile to each side (the reflection of the triangle in that edge) and then fill in the gaps at each vertex. This results in a total of 3 + (2a – 3) + (2b - 3) + (2c - 3) = 2(a + b + c) - 6 new triangles. The new vertices are of two types. Those which are vertices of the triangles attached to sides of the original triangle, which are connected to 2 vertices of Δ. Each of these lie in three new triangles which intersect at that vertex. The remainder are connected to a unique vertex of Δ and belong to two new triangles which have a common edge. Thus there are 3 + (2a – 4) + (2b - 4) + (2c - 4) = 2(a + b + c) - 9 new vertices. By construction there is no overlapping.

This process can be repeated for P2 to get P3 by first adding tiles to each edge of P2 and then filling in the tiles round each vertex of P2. Then the process can be repeated from P3, to get P4 and so on, successively producing Pn from Pn – 1. It can be checked inductively that these are all convex polygons, with non-overlapping tiles.
Indeed, as in the first step of the process there are two types of tile in building Pn from Pn – 1, those attached to an edge of Pn – 1 and those attached to a single vertex. Similarly there are two types of vertex, one in which two new tiles meet and those in which three tiles meet.

It therefore has to be verified that in constructing Pn from Pn − 1:

To prove (a), note that by convexity, the polygon Pn − 1 is the intersection of the convex half-spaces defined by the full circular arcs defining its boundary. Thus at a given vertex of Pn − 1 there are two such circular arcs defining two sectors: one sector contains the interior of Pn − 1, the other contains the interiors of the new triangles added around the given vertex. This can be visualized by using a Möbius transformation to map the upper half plane to the unit disk and the vertex to the origin; the interior of the polygon and each of the new triangles lie in different sectors of the unit disk. Thus (a) is proved.

Before proving (c) and (b), a Möbius transformation can be applied to map the upper half plane to the unit disk and a fixed point in the interior of Δ to the origin.

The proof of (c) proceeds by induction. Note that the radius joining the origin to a vertex of the polygon Pn − 1 makes an angle of less than 2/3 with each of the edges of the polygon at that vertex if exactly two triangles of Pn − 1 meet at the vertex, since each has an angle less than or equal to /3 at that vertex. To check this is true when three triangles of Pn − 1 meet at the vertex,  C say, suppose that the middle triangle has its base on a side AB of Pn − 2. By induction the radii OA and OB makes angles of less than or equal to 2/3 with the edge AB. In this case the region in the sector between the radii OA and OB outside the edge AB is convex as the intersection of three convex regions. By induction the angles at A and B are greater than or equal to  /3. Thus the geodesics to C from A and B start off in the region; by convexity, the triangle ABC lies wholly inside the region. Hence the radius OC lies inside the angle of the triangle ABC near C. Thus the angles between OC and the two edges of   meeting at C are less than or equal to /3 + /3 = 2/3, as claimed.

To prove (b), it must be checked how new triangles in Pn intersect.

First consider the tiles added to the edges of Pn – 1. Adopting similar notation to (c), let AB be the base of the tile and C the third vertex. Then the radii OA and OB make angles of less than or equal to 2/3 with the edge AB and  the reasoning in the proof of (c) applies to prove that the triangle ABC lies within the sector defined by the radii OA and OB. This is true for each edge of Pn – 1. Since the interiors of sectors defined by distinct edges are disjoint, new triangles of this type only intersect as claimed.

Next consider the additional tiles added for each vertex of Pn – 1. Taking the vertex to be A, three are two edges AB1 and AB2 of Pn – 1 that meet at A. Let C1 and C2 be the extra vertices of the tiles added to these edges. Now the additional tiles added at A lie in the sector defined by radii OB1 and OB2. It is therefore wholly contained in the sector defined by the radii OC1 and OC2. Since the interiors of these sectors are all disjoint, this implies all the claims about how the added tiles intersect.

Finally it remains to prove that the tiling formed by the union of the triangles covers the whole of the upper half plane. Any point z covered by the tiling lies in a polygon Pn and hence a polygon Pn +1 . It therefore lies in a copy of the original triangle Δ as well as a copy of P2 entirely contained in Pn +1 . The hyperbolic distance between Δ and the exterior of P2 is equal to r > 0. Thus the hyperbolic distance between z and points not coverered by the tiling is at least  r.  Since this applies to all points in the tiling, the set covered by the tiling is closed. On the other hand, the tiling is open since it coincides with the union of the interiors of the polygons Pn. By connectivity, the tessellation must cover the whole of the upper half plane.

To see how to handle the case when an angle of Δ is a right angle, note that the inequality

.

implies that if one of the angles is a right angle, say a = 2, then both b and c are greater than 2 and one of them, b say, must be greater than 3. In this case, reflecting the triangle across the side AB gives an isosceles hyperbolic triangle with angles /c, /c and 2/b. If 2/b ≤ /3, i.e. b is greater than 5, then all the angles of the doubled triangle are less than or equal to /3. In that case the construction of the tessellation above through increasing convex polygons adapts word for word to this case except that around the vertex with angle 2/b, only b—and not 2b—copies of the triangle are required to tile a neighborhood of the vertex. This is possible because the doubled triangle is isosceles. The tessellation for the doubled triangle yields that for the original triangle on cutting all the larger triangles in half.

It remains to treat the case when b equals 4 or 5. If b = 4, then c ≥ 5: in this case if c ≥ 6, then b and c can be switched and the argument above applies, leaving the case b = 4 and c = 5. If b = 5, then c ≥ 4.  The case c ≥ 6 can be handled by swapping b and c, so that the only extra case is b = 5 and c = 5. This last isosceles triangle is the doubled version of the first exceptional triangle, so only that triangle Δ1—with angles /2, /4 and /5 and hyperbolic area /20—needs to be considered (see below).  handles this case by a general method which works for all right angled triangles for which the two other angles are less than or equal to /4. The previous method for constructing P2, P3, ... is modified by adding an extra triangle each time an angle 3/2 arises at a vertex. The same reasoning applies to prove there is no overlapping and that the tiling covers the hyperbolic upper half plane.

On the other hand, the given configuration gives rise to an arithmetic triangle group. In 1977 Takeuchi obtained a complete classification of arithmetic triangle groups (there are only finitely many) and determined when two of them are commensurable. The particular example is related to Bring's curve and the arithmetic theory implies that the triangle group for Δ1  contains the triangle group for the triangle Δ2 with angles /4, /4 and /5 as a non-normal subgroup of index 6.

Doubling the triangles  Δ1 and Δ2, this implies that there should be a relation between 6 triangles  Δ3 with angles /2, /5 and /5 and hyperbolic area /10 and a triangle Δ4 with angles /5, /5 and /10 and hyperbolic area 3/5.  established such a relation directly by completely elementary geometric means, without reference to the arithmetic theory: indeed as illustrated in the fifth figure below, the quadrilateral obtained by reflecting across a side of a triangle of type Δ4 can be tiled by 12 triangles of type Δ3.  The tessellation by triangles of the type Δ4 can be handled by the main method in this section; this therefore proves the existence of the tessellation by triangles of type Δ3 and Δ1.

Triangles with one or two cusps
In the case of a Schwarz triangle with one or two cusps, the process of tiling becomes simpler; but it is easier to use a different method going back to Hecke to prove that these exhaust the hyperbolic upper half plane.

In the case of one cusp and non-zero angles /a, /b with a, b integers greater than one, the tiling can be envisaged in the unit disk with the vertex having angle /a at the origin.  The tiling starts by adding 2a – 1  copies of the triangle at the origin by successive reflections. This results in a polygon P1 with 2a cusps and between each two 2a vertices each with an angle /b. The polygon is therefore convex.  For each non-ideal vertex of P1, the unique triangle with that vertex can be similar reflected around that vertex, thus adding 2b – 1 new triangles, 2b – 1 new ideal points and 2 b – 1 new vertices with angle /a. The resulting polygon P2 is thus made up of 2a(2b – 1) cusps and the same number of vertices each with an angle of /a, so is convex. The process can be continued in this way to obtain convex polygons P3, P4, and so on. The polygon Pn will have vertices having angles alternating between 0 and /a for n even and between 0 and /b for n odd. By construction the triangles only overlap at edges or vertices, so form a tiling.

The case where the triangle has two cusps and one non-zero angle /a can be reduced to the case of one cusp by observing that the trinale is the double of a triangle with one cusp and non-zero angles /a and  /b with b = 2. The tiling then proceeds as before.

To prove that these give tessellations, it is more convenient to work in the upper half plane. Both cases can be treated simultaneously, since the case of two cusps is obtained by doubling a triangle with one cusp and non-zero angles /a and /2. So consider the geodesic triangle in the upper half plane with angles 0, /a, /b with a, b integers greater than one. The interior of such a triangle can be realised as the region X in the upper half plane lying outside the unit disk |z| ≤ 1 and between two lines parallel to the imaginary axis through points u and v on the unit circle. Let Γ be the triangle group generated by the three reflections in the sides of the triangle.

Let λ = Re a and μ = Re b so that, without loss of generality, λ < 0 ≤ μ. The three reflections in the sides are given by

Thus T = R3∘R2 is translation by μ − λ. It follows that for any z1 in the upper half plane, there is an element g1 in the subgroup Γ1 of Γ generated by T such that w1 = g1(z1) satisfies λ ≤ Re w1 ≤ μ, i.e. this strip is a fundamental domain for the translation group Γ1.  If |w1| ≥ 1, then w1 lies in X and the result is proved. Otherwise let z2 = R1(w1) and find g2
Γ1 such that w2 = g2(z2)  satisfies λ ≤ Re w2 ≤ μ. If |w2| ≥ 1 then the result is proved. Continuing in this way, either some wn satisfies |wn| ≥ 1, in which case the result is proved; or |wn| < 1 for all n. Now since gn + 1 lies in  Γ1 and |wn| < 1,

In particular

and

Thus, from the inequality above, the points (wn) lies in the compact set |z| ≤ 1,  λ ≤ Re z ≤ μ and Im z ≥ Im w 1. It follows that |wn| tends to 1; for if not, then there would be an r < 1 such that |wm| ≤ r for inifitely many m and then the last equation above would imply that Im wn tends to infinity, a contradiction.

Let w be a limit point of the wn, so that |w| = 1. Thus w lies on the arc of the unit circle between u and v. If w ≠ u, v, then R1 wn would lie in X for n sufficiently large, contrary to assumption. Hence w =u or v. Hence for n sufficiently large wn lies close to u or v and therefore must lie in one of the reflections of the triangle about the vertex u or v, since these fill out neighborhoods of u and v.

Ideal triangles
The tessellation for an ideal triangle with all its vertices on the unit circle and all its angles 0 can be considered as a special case of the tessellation for a triangle with one cusp and two now zero angles /3 and /2. Indeed, the ideal triangle is made of six copies one-cusped triangle obtained by reflecting the smaller triangle about the vertex with angle /3. 

This starts from the basic step that generates the tessellation, the reflection of an ideal triangle in one of its sides. Reflection corresponds to the process of inversion in projective geometry and taking the projective harmonic conjugate, which can be defined in terms of the cross ratio. In fact if p, q, r, s are distinct points in the Riemann sphere, then there is a unique complex Möbius transformation g sending p, q and s to 0, ∞  and 1 respectively. The cross ratio (p, q; r, s) is defined to be g(r) and is given by the formula

By definition it is invariant under Möbius transformations. If a, b lie on the real axis, the harmonic conjugate of c with respect to a and b is defined to be the unique real number d such that (a, b; c, d) = −1. So for example if a = 1 and b = –1, the conjugate of r is  1/r. In general Möbius invariance can be used to obtain an explicit formula for d in terms of a, b and c. Indeed, translating the centre t = (a + b)/2 of the circle with diameter having endpoints a and b to 0, d – t is the harmonic conjugate of c – t with respect to a - t and b – t. Thus

so that

It will now be shown that there is a parametrisation of such ideal triangles given by rationals in reduced form

with a and c satisfying the "neighbour condition" p2q1 − q2p1 = 1.

The middle term b is called the Farey sum or mediant of the outer terms and written

The formula for the reflected triangle gives

Similarly the reflected triangle in the second semicircle gives a new vertex b ⊕ c. It is immediately verified that a and b satisfy the neighbour condition, as do b and c.

Now this procedure can be used to keep track of the triangles obtained by successively reflecting the basic triangle Δ with vertices 0, 1 and ∞. It suffices to consider the strip with 0 ≤ Re z ≤ 1, since the same picture is reproduced in parallel strips by applying reflections in the lines Re z = 0 and 1. The ideal triangle with vertices 0, 1, ∞ reflects in the semicircle with base [0,1] into the triangle with vertices a = 0, b = 1/2, c = 1. Thus a = 0/1 and c = 1/1 are neighbours and b = a ⊕ c. The semicircle is split up into two smaller semicircles with bases [a,b] and [b,c]. Each of these intervals splits up into two intervals by the same process, resulting in 4 intervals. Continuing in this way, results into subdivisions into 8, 16, 32 intervals, and so on. At the nth stage, there are 2n adjacent intervals with  2n + 1 endpoints. The construction above shows that successive endpoints satisfy the neighbour condition so that new endpoints resulting from reflection are given by the Farey sum formula.

To prove that the tiling covers the whole hyperbolic plane, it suffices to show that every rational in [0,1] eventually occurs as an endpoint. There are several ways to see this. They give a direct proof that every rational appears. Indeed, starting with {0/1,1/1}, successive endpoints are introduced at level n+1 by adding Farey sums or mediants  between all consecutive terms ,  at the nth level (as described above). Suppose that at some level  is sandwiched between successive terms . These inequalities force  and 
 and hence, since ,

This puts an upper bound on the sum of the numerators and denominators. On the other hand, the mediant   can be introduced and either equals , in which case the rational  appears at this level; or the mediant provides a new interval containing  with strictly larger numerator-and-denominator sum. The process must therefore terminate after at most  steps, thus proving that  appears.

A second approach relies on the modular group G = SL(2,Z). The Euclidean algorithm implies that this group is generated by the matrices

In fact let H be the subgroup of G generated by S and T. Let

be an element of SL(2,Z). Thus ad − cb = 1, so that a and c are coprime. Let

Applying S if necessary, it can be assumed that |a| > |c|
(equality is not possible by coprimeness). We write a = mc + r with
0 ≤ r ≤ |c|. But then

This process can be continued until one of the entries is 0, in which case the other is necessarily ±1. Applying a power of S if necessary, it follows that v =  h u for some h in H. Hence

with p, q integers. Clearly p = 1, so that h−1g = Tq. Thus g = h Tq lies in H as required.

To prove that all rationals in [0,1] occur, it suffices to show that G carries Δ onto triangles in the tessellation. This follows by first noting that S and T carry Δ on to such a triangle: indeed as Möbius transformations, S(z) = –1/z and T(z) = z + 1, so these give reflections of Δ in two of its sides. But then S and T conjugate the reflections in the sides of Δ into reflections in the sides of SΔ and TΔ, which lie in Γ. Thus G normalizes Γ. Since triangles in the tessellation are exactly those of the form gΔ with g in Γ, it follows that S and T, and hence all elements of G, permute triangles in the tessellation. Since every rational is of the form g(0) for g in G, every rational in [0,1] is the vertex of a triangle in the tessellation.

The reflection group and tessellation for an ideal triangle can also be regarded as a limiting case of the Schottky group for three disjoint unnested circles on the Riemann sphere. Again this group is generated by hyperbolic reflections in the three circles. In both cases the three circles have a common circle which cuts them orthogonally. Using a Möbius transformation, it may be assumed to be the unit circle or equivalently the real axis in the upper half plane.

Approach of Siegel 
In this subsection the approach of Carl Ludwig Siegel to the tessellation theorem for triangles is outlined.  Siegel's less elementary approach does not use convexity, instead relying on the theory of Riemann surfaces, covering spaces and a version of the monodromy theorem for coverings. It has been generalized to give proofs of the more general Poincaré polygon theorem. (Note that the special case of tiling by regular n-gons with interior angles 2/n is an immediate consequence of the tessellation by Schwarz triangles with angles /n, /n and /2.)

Let Γ be the free product Z2 ∗ Z2 ∗ Z2. If Δ = ABC is a Schwarz triangle with angles /a, /b and /c, where a, b, c ≥ 2, then there is a natural map of Γ onto the group generated by reflections in the sides of Δ. Elements of Γ are described by a product of the three generators where no two adjacent generators are equal.  At the vertices A, B and C the product of reflections in the sides meeting at the vertex define rotations by angles 2/a,  2/b and 2/c; Let gA, gB and gC be the corresponding products of generators of Γ = Z2 ∗ Z2 ∗ Z2. Let Γ0 be the normal subgroup of index 2 of Γ, consisting of elements that are the product of an even number of generators; and let Γ1 be the normal subgroup of Γ generated by (gA)a, (gB)b and (gC)c. These act trivially on Δ. Let  = Γ/Γ1 and 0 = Γ0/Γ1.

At an interior point of a triangle there is an obvious chart. As a point of the interior of an edge the chart is obtained by reflecting the triangle across the edge. At a vertex of a triangle with interior angle /n, the chart is obtained from the 2n copies of the triangle obtained by reflecting it successively around that vertex. The group  acts by deck transformations of Σ, with elements in 0 acting as holomorphic mappings and elements not in 0 acting as antiholomorphic mappings.

There is a natural map P of Σ into the hyperbolic plane. It is also easy to verify that a neighbourhood of an interior point of an edge is taken into a neighbourhood of the image; and similarly for vertices. Thus P is locally a homeomorphism and so takes open sets to open sets. The image P(Σ), i.e. the union of the translates g(), is therefore an open subset of the upper half plane. On the other hand, this set is also closed. Since the hyperbolic distance is -invariant, it follows that if z lies within a distance less than δ from Γ() it actually lies in Γ(), so this union is closed. By connectivity it follows that P(Σ) is the whole upper half plane.

On the other hand, P is a local homeomorphism, so a covering map. Since the upper half plane is simply connected, it follows that P is one-one and hence the translates of Δ tessellate the upper half plane. This is a consequence of the following version of the monodromy theorem for coverings of Riemann surfaces: if Q is a covering map between Riemann surfaces Σ1 and Σ2, then any path in Σ2 can be lifted to a path in Σ1 and any two homotopic paths with the same end points lift to homotopic paths 
with the same end points; an immediate corollary is that if Σ2 is simply connected, Q must be a homeomorphism. To apply this, let Σ1 = Σ, let Σ2 be the upper half plane and let Q = P. By the corollary of the monodromy theorem, P must be one-one.

It also follows that g(Δ) = Δ if and only if g lies in Γ1, so that the homomorphism of 0 into the Möbius group is faithful.

Hyperbolic reflection groups 

The tessellation of the Schwarz triangles can be viewed as a generalization of the theory of infinite Coxeter groups, following the theory of hyperbolic reflection groups developed algebraically by Jacques Tits and geometrically by Ernest Vinberg. In the case of the Lobachevsky or hyperbolic plane, the ideas originate in the nineteenth-century work of Henri Poincaré and Walther von Dyck. As Joseph Lehner has pointed out in Mathematical Reviews, however, rigorous proofs that reflections of a Schwarz triangle generate a tessellation have often been incomplete, his own 1964 book "Discontinuous Groups and Automorphic Forms", being one example. Carathéodory's elementary treatment in his 1950 textbook "Funktiontheorie", translated into English in 1954, and Siegel's 1954 account using the monodromy principle are rigorous proofs. The approach using Coxeter groups will be summarised here, within the general framework of classification of hyperbolic reflection groups.

Define  to be the group with presentation having generators ,  and  that are all involutions and satisfy = 1, 
() = 1 and  = 1. If one of the integers is infinite, then the product has infinite order.

Set  = cos  /  if  ≥ 2 is finite and cosh  with  > 0 otherwise; similarly set  = cos  /  or cosh  and  = cos  /  or cosh . Let e, e and e be a basis for a 3-dimensional real vector space  with symmetric bilinear form  such that (e,e) = − , (e,e) =  −  and (e,e) = − , with the three diagonal entries equal to one. The symmetric bilinear form  is non-degenerate with signature (2,1). Define (v) = v − 2 (v,e) e, (v) = v − 2 (v,e) e and
(v) = v − 2 (v,e) e.

Theorem (geometric representation).
e and e with simple eigenvalue −1. The products of the operators have orders corresponding to the presentation above (so  has order , etc).

The bilinear form  for the basis has matrix 

 

so has determinant 1−2−2−2−2. If  = 2, say, then the eigenvalues of the matrix are 1 and 1 ± (2+2)½. The condition −1 + −1 < ½ immediately forces 2+2 > 1, so that Λ must have signature (2,1). Clearly the case where all are equal to 3 is impossible. But then the determinant of the matrix is negative while its trace is positive. As a result two eigenvalues are positive and one negative, i.e. Λ has signature (2,1).

To check the order of the products like , it suffices to note that:

 the reflections  and  generate a finite or infinite dihedral group;

(1) is clear since if  =  generates a normal subgroup with –1 = –1. For (2),  is invariant by definition and the matrix is positive-definite since 0 < cos  /  < 1. Since  has signature (2,1), a non-zero vector  in  must satisfy < 0. Finally in (1) 

 = exp . Moreover a straightforward induction argument shows that if  =  /  then

and if  > 0 then

In particular
Thus there is a unique vector w = e +  e +  e in  satisfying (w) = w and (w) = w. Explicitly  = ( + )/(1 – 2) and  = ( + )/(1 – 2).

Remark on representations of dihedral groups. In the case above, however, where the bilinear form  is no longer a positive definite inner product, different ad hoc reasoning has to be given.

Theorem (Tits). The geometric representation of the Coxeter group is faithful.

In the text, the fundamental chamber was introduced by an inductive argument; exercise 8 in §4 of Chapter V was expanded by Vinay Deodhar to develop a theory of positive and negative roots and thus shorten the original argument of Tits.

Let X be the convex cone of sums e + e + e with real non-negative coefficients, not all of them zero. For  in the group , define 

It is routine to check from the definitions that

if |ℓ() – ℓ()| = 1 for a simple reflection  and, if  ≠ 1, there is always a simple reflection  such that ℓ() = ℓ() + 1;

Proposition.

The assertion will be proved by induction on ℓ() = , it being trivial for  = 0.
Assume that ℓ() = ℓ() + 1. If ℓ() =  > 0, without less of generality it may be assumed that the minimal expression for  ends with .... This implies that ℓ() = ℓ() + 1 and ℓ() = ℓ() + 1. Since ℓ() < , the induction hypothesis shows that both e and
But that has already been verified in the formulas above.

Corollary (proof of Tits' theorem). The geometric representation is faithful.

It suffices to show that if  fixes e, e and e, then  = 1. Considering a minimal expression for  ≠ 1, the conditions ℓ() = ℓ() + 1 clearly cannot be simultaneously satisfied by the three simple reflections . 

Note that, as a consequence of Tits' theorem, the generators  = ,  =  and  =  satisfy  = 1,  = 1 and  = 1 with  = 1. The presentation corresponds to the fundamental domain obtained by reflecting two sides of the geodesic triangle to form a geodesic parallelogram (a special case of Poincaré's polygon theorem).

Further consequences. The roots are the disjoint union of the positive roots and the negative roots. The simple reflection  permutes every positive root other than e.

Fundamental domain and Tits cone.

Let  be the 3-dimensional closed Lie subgroup of GL() preserving . As  can be identified with a 3-dimensional Lorentzian or Minkowski space with signature (2,1), the group  is isomorphic to the Lorentz group O(2,1) and therefore SL±(2,R) / {±}. Choosing e to be a positive root vector in X, the stabilizer of e is a maximal compact subgroup  of  isomorphic to O(2). The homogeneous space  =  /  is a symmetric space of constant negative curvature, which can be identified with the 2-dimensional hyperboloid or Lobachevsky plane . Results about the Tits fundamental chamber have a natural interpretation in terms of the corresponding Schwarz triangle, which translate directly into the properties of the tessellation of the geodesic triangle through the hyperbolic reflection group .

Approach of Maskit, de Rham and Beardon 

The Swiss mathematicians  and Haefliger have provided an introductory account, taking geometric group theory as their starting point.

See also 
 Schwarz triangle tessellation
 List of uniform polyhedra by Schwarz triangle
 Wythoff symbol
 Wythoff construction
 Uniform polyhedron
 Nonconvex uniform polyhedron
 Density (polytope)
 Goursat tetrahedron
 Regular hyperbolic tiling
 Uniform tilings in hyperbolic plane

Notes

References 

, Table 3: Schwarz's Triangles
  (Note that Coxeter references this as "Zur Theorie der hypergeometrischen Reihe", which is the short title used in the journal page headers).
 

 
 
 
 
 
 
 
 
 
 
 
 
 
 
 
 
 
 
 
 
 
 
 
 
 
 
 
 
 
 
 
 
 
 
 
 
 
 
 
 
 
  This manuscript was the foundational text for the theory of Coxeter groups, used for preparing Chapter IV of Bourbaki's Groupes et Algèbres de Lie; it was first published in 2001.

External links 
 
 

Spherical trigonometry
Polyhedra